Agh Kahriz (also Romanized as Āgh Kahrīz; also known as Āq Kahrīz) is a village in Yekanat Rural District, Yamchi District, Marand County, East Azerbaijan Province, Iran. At the 2006 census, its population was 13, in 7 families.

References 

Populated places in Marand County